Body-focused repetitive behavior (BFRB) is an umbrella name for impulse control behaviors involving compulsively damaging one's physical appearance or causing physical injury.

Body-focused repetitive behavior disorders (BFRBDs) in ICD-11 is in development.

BFRB disorders are currently estimated to be under the obsessive-compulsive spectrum. They are also associated with ADHD and anxiety.

Causes
The cause of BFRBs is unknown.

Emotional variables may have a differential impact on the expression of BFRBs.

Research has suggested that the urge to repetitive self-injury is similar to a body-focused repetitive behavior but others have argued that for some the condition is more akin to a substance abuse disorder.

Researchers are investigating a possible genetic component.

Onset
BFRBs most often begin in late childhood or in the early teens.

Diagnosis

Types
The main BFRB disorders are:
 Skin
 Dermatillomania (excoriation disorder), skin picking
 Dermatophagia, skin nibbling
 Mouth
 Morsicatio buccarum, cheek biting
 Morsicatio labiorum, inner lip biting
 Morsicatio linguarum, tongue biting
 Hands
 Onychophagia, nail biting
 Onychotillomania, nail picking
 Nose
 Rhinotillexomania, compulsive nose picking
 Hair
 Trichophagia, hair nibbling
 Trichotemnomania, hair cutting
 Trichotillomania, hair pulling
 Eyes
 Mucus fishing syndrome - compulsion to remove or "fish" strands of mucus from the eye

Treatment

Psychotherapy
Treatment can include behavior modification therapy, medication, and family therapy. The evidence base criteria for BFRBs is strict and methodical. Individual behavioral therapy has been shown as a "probably effective" evidence-based therapy to help with thumb sucking, and possibly nail biting. Cognitive behavioral therapy was cited as experimental evidence based therapy to treat trichotillomania and nail biting; a systematic review found best evidence for habit reversal training and decoupling. Another form of treatment that focuses on mindfulness, stimuli and rewards has proven effective in some people. However, no treatment was deemed well-established to treat any form of BFRBs.

Pharmacotherapy
Excoriation disorder, and trichotillomania have been treated with inositol and N-acetylcysteine.

Prevalence
BFRBs are among the most poorly understood, misdiagnosed, and undertreated groups of disorders. BFRBs may affect at least 1 out of 20 people. These collections of symptoms have been known for a number of years, but only recently have appeared in widespread medical literature. Trichotillomania alone is believed to affect 10 million people in the United States.

See also 
 Stereotypic movement disorder
 Rhythmic Movement Disorder
 Body dysmorphic disorder
 Habit reversal training
 Decoupling treatment

References

External links 

 
Conditions of the skin appendages
Neurocutaneous conditions
Self-harm